Carlo Grippo (born 8 January 1955, in Rome) is a former Italian middle distance runner. Also notable as an International executive for Global Sport and Fashion Brands.

Biography
Carlo Grippo participated at two editions of the Summer Olympics (1976 and 1980), he has 25 caps in national team from 1974 to 1981.

Achievements

National titles
Carlo Grippo has won 10 times the individual national championship.
6 wins in the 800 metres (1974, 1976, 1978, 1979, 1980, 1981)
1 win in the 1500 metres (1980)
2 wins in the 800 metres indoor (1977, 1979)
1 win in the 1500 metres indoor (1974)

See also
 Italian all-time lists - 800 metres
 800 metres winners of Italian Athletics Championships

References

External links
 

1955 births
Athletes from Rome
Italian male middle-distance runners
Athletes (track and field) at the 1976 Summer Olympics
Athletes (track and field) at the 1980 Summer Olympics
Olympic athletes of Italy
Living people
Athletics competitors of Centro Sportivo Carabinieri